LienVietPostBank is a Vietnamese retail bank based in Hanoi.

Background
Lien Viet Post Joint Stock Commercial Bank, formerly known as LienVietBank before 2011, is a private Vietnamese retail bank providing banking products and services through its own transaction offices across 63 cities and provinces, postal transaction offices and Vi Viet, its mobile wallet developed in-house, merchants nationwide .

LienVietPostBank is considered to be in the top 10 biggest private commercial banks in Vietnam in terms of assets and equity, ranks 107th in VNR500 - Top 500 largest enterprises and 42nd in Top 500 private enterprises in Vietnam in 2017. Currently, LienVietPostBank is the exclusive bank to provide postal savings services and other banking services throughout more than 10,000 post offices in Vietnam through its strategic 50-year cooperation agreement with Vietnam Post Corporation.

At the end of 2017, Moody's assigned first-time ratings to LienVietPostBank, which stated B2 ratings for Long-term local currency deposit, Long-term foreign currency deposit and Long-term local and foreign currency issuer. In addition, Moody’s also assigned LienVietPostBank’s short-term local and foreign currency deposits and issuer ratings of Not Prime, Baseline Credit Assessment (BCA) and adjusted BCA of b2 and Counterparty Risk Assessments of B2 (cr)/NP (cr). These are the highest ratings given to a private Vietnamese commercial bank by Moody's.

Milestones

Main shareholders

Vietnam Post Corporation (VNPost): 11.45% 

(Him Lam Corporation is no longer a shareholder of LienVietPostBank since June 2017)

Network
As of June 30, 2018, LienVietPostBank's network in Vietnam includes:

▪ Bank network: 327 branches and transaction offices.

▪ Postal transaction office (PTO) network: 975 PTOs.

▪ Transaction points for Vi Viet mobile wallet (shops, kiosks, retail outlets): more than 20,500

Network expansion plan (By 2020):

▪ Presence in every districts of Vietnam with over 800 bank-owned branches and transaction offices in total.

▪ 50,000 Vi Viet transaction points in every commune of Vietnam.

Vi Viet e-wallet
Vi Viet was developed from 2015 by the LienVietPostBank and launched in September 2016 as a multi-platform mobile wallet, currently supporting Android and iOS operating systems as well as available on its website. Besides being a payment gateway for various e-commerce transactions, Vi Viet is also an efficient financial management tool for all individuals, households and small businesses.

Current features available on Vi Viet include online payment and transfer, cash in/cash out from/to most domestic bank account, utilities bill payments (electricity, water, internet, television, apartment fees, telecommunication, tuition fee, etc.), online shopping (air tickets, hotel booking/reservation, e-commerce payment, etc.), mobile recharge, micro savings and micro loans. Vi Viet is expected to promote cashless payment and eventually financial inclusion in Vietnam, especially in suburban and rural areas. As of Q1 2018, there have been 2.1 million Vi Viet users and 18,000 stores/merchants accepting Vi Viet payment.

In 2018, Vi Viet was also selected by The Asian Banker magazine for the best mobile banking application in Vietnam. Previously, Vi Viet was awarded the runner-up prize for Financial Industry Application by the Asia-Pacific ICT Alliance Awards program for 2017.

Key financial figures

References

Banks of Vietnam
Postal savings system